The Roman Empress is a 1670 tragedy by the writer William Joyner. It was first staged by the King's Company at the Theatre Royal, Drury Lane.

The original cast included Michael Mohun as Valentius, Edward Kynaston as Florus, Richard Bell as Honorius, Edward Lydall as Statilius, William Beeston as  Macrinus, Rebecca Marshall as Fulvia, Elizabeth Knepp as  Antonia, Marmaduke Watson as Hostilius, William Cartwright as Arsenius, Elizabeth Boutell as Aurelia and Katherine Corey as Sophonia. The published version of the play was dedicated to the writer Charles Sedley.

References

Bibliography
 Van Lennep, W. The London Stage, 1660-1800: Volume One, 1660-1700. Southern Illinois University Press, 1960.

1670 plays
English plays
West End plays
Tragedy plays
Historical plays
Plays set in ancient Rome